The Paul Nicholas School of Acting & Performing Arts was a franchise of stage and performance schools created by actor and singer  Paul Nicholas for young people aged four to 18. It closed in 2012.

References

Education in the Borough of Wyre